Speed Demon is a land speed racing car built in 2010 by Ron Main for George Poteet.

In September 2010, George Poteet  made a serious attempt to break the flying mile and flying kilometer record for  piston-engined wheel-driven cars. Speed Demon is powered by a  aluminum block 'Hellfire' V8, built by Kenny Duttweiler. Their effort was thwarted by a number of parts failures.

(Because this was not done within the two-hour limit demanded by FIA, the record is not considered official.)

Speed Demon was displayed at the 2018 Detroit Autorama.

Poteet intends to attempt the absolute record for wheel-driven cars, currently held by Don Vesco’s Turbinator.

Notes

External links 
Hot Rod online
Speed Demon online
On All Cylinders
Classic Car News

Wheel-driven land speed record cars
Streamliner cars